Basketball was contested at the 2015 Summer Universiade from July 4 to July 13 in Gwangju, South Korea. In total, 40 teams competed in the 2015 Summer Universiade (24 men's teams and 16 women's teams).

Medal summary

Medal table

Medal events

Men

Teams

Women

Teams

References

External links 
 Official Games site

 
2015 in basketball
Basketball
2015
International basketball competitions hosted by South Korea